The Arouch Movement or Berber Arouch Citizens' Movement (Kabyle: Leɛṛac; French: Mouvement citoyen des Aarchs) is an organization in Algeria representing the Kabyle people, a Berber group of the province of Kabylie. Their name, Arouch, is the plural form of the word Arch, referring to a traditional Kabyle form of democratic political assembly. The movement was started after the Black Spring disturbances in 2001, in which 126 Kabyle protesters were killed by Algerian gendarmes. The Arouch have a horizontal leadership and it has no leader, although charismatic arouch representatives like Belaïd Abrika have emerged.

The United States Department of State and Congressional Research Service have reported on state harassment of the Arouch.

Goals 

The Arouch has stated political goals in a document known as the El Kseur Platform. Among them are:

Recognition of the Berber language as a national and official language alongside Arabic; the demand was met.
The withdrawal of the Algerian gendarmerie security forces from Kabylie; the demand was met.
Expanded democracy.
Expanded social rights.

The Arouch views about the status of Kabylie are as diverse as the number of its representatives, some supporting a federal state, others support a regional autonomy, and the rest are for decentralization.

See also 
 Politics of Algeria
 Rally for Culture and Democracy (RCD) - The main Liberal Berber party.
 Socialist Forces Front (FFS) - The main Socialist Berber party.

References

External links
Africa Institute of South Africa report
U.S. Department of State 2004 Report on Human Rights Practices in Algeria

Algerian democracy movements
Berberism in Algeria
Berberist political parties
Kabylie
Political parties in Algeria
Political parties with year of establishment missing